The 2016 International Champions Cup (or ICC) was a series of friendly association football tournaments that began on 22 July and ended on 13 August 2016.

In December 2015, Juventus, Tottenham Hotspur and Melbourne Victory were confirmed to play in the Australian version of the tournament. Atlético Madrid were confirmed as the fourth team on 1 March. Melbourne Victory was the first team from the Asian Football Confederation to compete in the International Champions Cup.

On 5 February 2016, Manchester City was announced as a competing team once again, this time in the China edition. They were joined by Manchester United and Borussia Dortmund on 23 March 2016. Borussia Dortmund topped the table of this edition but as the match between Manchester City and Manchester United was cancelled no trophy was awarded.

The American dates were reported in March 2016 as featuring Barcelona, Bayern Munich, Celtic, Chelsea, Liverpool, Inter Milan, Milan, Real Madrid, Leicester City, and Paris Saint-Germain.

Teams

Venues

Matches

Australia

China

United States and Europe

Tables

Australia

China
Since a match was cancelled, no champion was declared.

United States and Europe

Media coverage

Notes

References

External links

 

International Champions Cup
International Champions Cup
International Champions Cup
International Champions Cup
Soccer in Melbourne
International Champions Cup
International Champions Cup